John or Jack Good may refer to:
I. J. Good (1916–2009), known as Jack, British statistician and cryptanalyst
Jack Good (producer) (1931–2017), British television, theatre and music producer
John Good (actor) (1919–1996), American actor in The Private Affairs of Bel Ami
John Good (footballer) (1933–2005), English footballer
John Good (Irish politician) (died 1941), Irish politician and company director
John F. Good (1936–2016), FBI agent who created the Abscam sting operation
John G. Good (born 1926), Pennsylvania politician
John Jay Good (1827–1882), mayor of Dallas
John Mason Good (1764–1827), English writer on medical, religious and classical subjects

See also
John Goode (disambiguation)
Johnny B. Goode, 1958 song by Chuck Berry
John the Good (disambiguation)